"Dance for Me" is a song by American singer Mary J. Blige featuring American rapper Common from her Blige's fifth studio album, No More Drama (2001). Produced by Dame Grease, the track was written by the artists alongside Bruce Miller with an additional writing credit going to Sting for the sampling of the 1979 song "The Bed's Too Big Without You" by English rock band the Police.

The song released as the album's second single in select European territories on January 28, 2002. The single never received a release within the United States, where "No More Drama" was released as the album's second single. The music video was directed by Urban Ström. There are two versions of the music video released. One is the video for the radio edit of the song, the other video is for the Plutonium Remix. Both versions feature rapper Common.

Track listings
All versions of "Dance for Me" feature Common.

UK CD1
 "Dance for Me" (radio edit) – 3:25
 "Dance for Me" (Plutonium rock mix) – 4:18
 "Dance for Me" (C-Swing Deliverance mix) – 4:56
 
UK CD2
 "Dance for Me" (radio edit) – 3:25
 "Dance for Me" (Sunship vocal mix) – 6:15
 "Dance for Me" (Sunship dub) – 4:25

UK 12-inch single
A1. "Dance for Me" (radio edit) – 3:25
A2. "Dance for Me" (Plutonium rock mix) – 4:18
B1. "Dance for Me" (C-Swing Deliverance mix) – 4:56
B2. "Dance for Me" (Sunship vocal mix) – 6:15

European CD single
 "Dance for Me" (radio edit) – 3:25
 "Dance for Me" (Plutonium radio edit) – 3:21

Australian CD single
 "Dance for Me" (radio edit) – 3:25
 "Dance for Me" (Plutonium rock mix) – 4:18
 "Dance for Me" (G-Club mix) – 7:12
 "Dance for Me" (Sunship main mix) – 6:15

Charts

Release history

References

Mary J. Blige songs
Common (rapper) songs
2001 songs
2002 singles
Songs written by Common (rapper)
Songs written by Mary J. Blige
Songs written by Sting (musician)